Hugh Alfred Garland (June 1, 1805 – October 14, 1854) was an American slaveholder, lawyer and politician. He served in the Virginia House of Delegates. In 1838 to 1841 he served as clerk of the United States House of Representatives. Garland was a staunch supporter of slavery in the United States, and he led the defense for Dred Scott's owner, John F. A. Sanford, in the case of Dred Scott v. Sandford, but died three years before the case was argued before the United States Supreme Court.

Early life
Garland was born to Alexander Spotswood Garland and Lucinda Rose on June 1, 1805, in Nelson County, Virginia. Lucinda Rose is daughter of Frances Taylor [Madison] Rose, who brother is James Madison. He is the father of Confederate Colonel Hugh A. Garland Jr., brother of Landon Garland, the uncle of Confederate Army General Samuel Garland Jr., and the great-nephew of United States Founding Father and fourth President of the United States James Madison.

He was educated at Hampden Sydney College, where he taught briefly. During his time at Hampden-Sydney College he delivered an address to the literary societies about the importance of classical education. Garland then studied law at the University of Virginia.

Career
Garland practiced the law in Boydton, Virginia, where his brother Landon Garland was a professor at Randolph Macon College. During that time, Garland's wife, Anne Burwell Garland, ran a female seminary. The house where they lived and operated the school is still extant.

In 1833, Garland was elected to the Virginia House of Delegates. Later in 1838 to 1841 he served as clerk of the United States House of Representatives, partly because of his staunch support of President Andrew Jackson's anti-bank policies while Garland was in the Virginia legislature. In 1839 he published a defense of the Democratic Party in the Democratic Review.

In September 1840, Garland addressed a meeting of Democrats in Groton, Connecticut, and attacked abolitionists. After this he was known as the champion of the "Northern Man with Southern feelings." In 1845 he delivered an oration commemorating Andrew Jackson in Petersburg, Virginia, where he was practicing law.

Changing fortunes following law practice in Petersburg, Virginia, led to a move in 1847 to St. Louis, where he was a lawyer for Dred Scott's owner. He and Lyman Decatur Norris were retained by the pro-slavery owner, Irene Emerson.

Ten slaves were in Hugh Garland in federal census in 1850 in Missouri. Anne Burwell Garland, his wife, owned Elizabeth Keckley. The widow Mrs. Garland freed Elizabeth Keckley and her son in 1855 for $1200. The half-sister of Mrs. Garland, who later became close to Mary Todd Lincoln, and wrote a memoir about her time in slavery.

Garland is remembered for a two-volume biography of John Randolph of Roanoke. The southern intellectual historian Michael O'Brien interprets Garland's biography of Randolph as influenced by the Romantic tradition and suggests that Garland made Randolph into a figure of the Romantic era. Garland also published Protestantism and Government (1852).

Death and legacy
Garland died unexpectedly in St. Louis on October 14, 1854, at age 49.

Garland's son, Hugh Alfred Garland Jr., (1837-1864) was appointed a colonel of the consolidated 1st-4th Missouri Infantry Regiment in the Confederate States Army during the American Civil War. He died in 1864 in the Battle of Franklin.

References

1854 deaths
1805 births
People from Nelson County, Virginia
Hampden–Sydney College alumni
University of Virginia alumni
American slave owners
American proslavery activists
People from Boydton, Virginia
American white supremacists
19th-century American lawyers